The 2006 video game Resistance: Fall of Man, developed by Insomniac Games, published by Sony Computer Entertainment and released for the PlayStation 3 video game console, features combat scenes that take place within a virtual representation of Manchester Cathedral in England set in an alternate history. It was released on 23 March 2007 in the United Kingdom. The use of images of the cathedral caused controversy with the leaders of the Church of England, which claimed its depiction to be desecration and copyright infringement, and that it was inappropriate of Sony to allow players to fire guns in a city with a gun problem. They have made several legal threats against Sony. They intended to make several demands of Sony, including an apology, a substantial donation, complete withdrawal of the game or modifying the segment featuring the interior of the cathedral, and financial support of Manchester groups trying to reduce gun crime in the city.

In response to the allegations, Sony stated that the game was not based on reality, and they believed they had adequate permissions necessary. They later added that the game was purely entertainment and fictional, comparing it to the television programme Doctor Who. Then-British Prime Minister Tony Blair commented that though companies should have more responsibility and sensitivity to the feelings of others, the issue would be immensely difficult. Although the copyright concerns were found to be without merit, Sony offered a formal apology to the Church of England and leaders of the cathedral in July 2007, stating that they did not intend to cause offence.

The controversy increased awareness of Resistance in the UK, which showed a rise in sales during the controversy. It was selected as a finalist amongst six other games at the 2007 BAFTA British Academy Video Game Awards for PC World Gamers Award, which is based on the sales and public reception of the nominated games. The Dean of Manchester, the Very Reverend Rogers Govender, criticised its selection by BAFTA due to the current controversy, requesting that either BAFTA or Sony withdraw it from the award. Neither chose to withdraw it from the award, but it ultimately lost to Football Manager 07.

Background

Resistance: Fall of Man is a science fiction and fantasy first-person shooter video game. The game is set in an alternate history 1951, and focuses on human resistance forces attempting to drive a mysterious alien-like invasion out of Great Britain. It was released as a PlayStation 3 launch title in Europe on 23 March 2007. Resistance features recreations of English landmarks throughout the game, including at one point a gun fight between player protagonist Nathan Hale and the alien species around the exterior and interior of Manchester Cathedral. The cathedral is a medieval church on Victoria Street in central Manchester and is the seat of the Bishop of Manchester. Built in the 15th century, it has been extensively refaced, restored and extended during the Victorian period, and then again following severe bomb damage in the 20th century.

Church leaders accused Sony of the virtual desecration of Manchester Cathedral, referring to one scene which depicts a shoot-out in which dozens of Leapers (small, scorpion-like enemies in the game) are killed during a bloody gun battle inside the cathedral. Officials described the use of the building as sick and sacrilegious, and stated Sony did not ask for permission to use the cathedral. They demanded an apology from Sony and the withdrawal of the game from shops, otherwise legal action would be considered. The cathedral's spokesman, David Marshall, told reporters that the cathedral had received many supportive e-mails for its stance and that they intended to make several demands of Sony. These included an apology, a substantial donation, complete withdrawal of the game or modifying the segment featuring the interior of the cathedral, and financial support of Manchester groups trying to reduce gun crime in the city.

Cathedral officials also described the use of guns in a city which has a gun crime problem as irresponsible. The Bishop of Manchester, the Right Reverend Nigel McCulloch, stated that it was well known that Manchester had a gun crime problem, and that it was beyond belief that a global manufacturer would re-create one of their cathedrals with photo-realistic quality. Insomniac, the game's developer, declined to comment, referring all inquires to Sony Computer Entertainment Europe. Sony Computer Entertainment Europe issued a statement, stating that they were aware of the concerns expressed by the Bishop of Manchester and the cathedral authorities, and take them seriously. However, they added that Resistance: Fall of Man is a fantasy science fiction game and not based on reality and that they believed they had sought and received all permissions necessary. Sony also stated that it would be contacting the cathedral on 11 June 2007 to understand their concerns in more detail. David Wilson, a Sony spokesman, told The Times that it was game-created footage, and not video or photography. Further, he compared it to science fiction shows such as Doctor Who, claiming that it was not based on reality at all.

At a meeting with church and cathedral officials, held on 11 June, reporters noted that three people had been shot within the city in the previous 72 hours. The attendees produced a letter by the Very Reverend Rogers Govender, on behalf of the Dean and Canons of Manchester Cathedral to Sony. It stated that they were currently seeking the advice of lawyers in the matter, and reserved their legal position in relation to the same. It demanded a substantial donation for the cathedral's work with youth in resisting the culture of gun crime and other forms of violence in our society. It further demanded the immediate withdrawal of the game, and that Sony not re-issue it without removing the section of the game containing the cathedral interior. Govender described the use of images of the cathedral as virtual desecration. The letter stressed that they were in consultation with their lawyers and urged Sony to contact them so there can be a mutually satisfactory conclusion to the matter. Govender told reporters that the church officials had only been told of the content on 8 June 2007, and, after watching footage of gameplay posted on YouTube, said they were dismayed beyond belief and were shocked to see a place of worship being presented to youths as a place where guns may be fired, and that every year, they invite hundreds of teenagers to see the cathedral and appreciate it as an alternative to violence. They added that it was a shame to have a game like this undermining such important work. They also sought that Sony apologise unreservedly.

Response
Nanako Kato, a spokesperson from Sony Computer Entertainment, addressed the matter from Tokyo. She pointed out that historical buildings are often used in entertainment, such as in iconic movie scenes involving Godzilla and the Tokyo Tower and King Kong in Manhattan. She acknowledged the church in the game holds a resemblance to Manchester Cathedral, but that the point was to depict a backdrop of an old church, not to illustrate a specific church. She added that Sony understands why the Church of England was offended especially because of its efforts to reduce the serious problem of gun violence in Manchester. She did not answer on whether Sony would donate money to the Cathedral's anti-gun program as the Church has demanded. At the time, over 2 million copies of the game had been sold.

The controversy raises questions about the range to which copyright law can extend. Alex Chapman of Campbell Hooper solicitors, stated "The Church will have an uphill battle in a legal claim against Sony, and indeed it is likely that there is no basis for a claim." He cited a provision in the UK's 1988 Copyright Designs and Patents act that "explicitly states that it is not copyright infringement to represent certain artistic works that are on public display". This includes sculptures and buildings which are "permanently situated in a public place or in premises open to the public". Chapman also pointed out that, in the UK, copyright expires 70 years after the person who created the work dies. He went on to say, "What all this means is that public buildings are generally fair game for inclusion in video games, films et cetera, and it is something that their owners just have to accept. What isn't fair game, however, is if the building is presented in a way that could be said to be defamatory in relation to those associated with it and this might be what the Church is more concerned about. Also if the representation of the building could be argued to have become so closely associated with a business that its representation amounts to a false endorsement of Sony or its products, or it is registered as a trademark, there may be issues. In each case however my impression is that the Church will have some difficulty in pursuing Sony. There is no law against insensitivity and as with many matters of this kind, it is the public reaction that might be more damaging than the legal one." An unofficial review, by lawyers at Freeth Cartwright, of the rights that Sony might have infringed concluded that the Church of England did not have a case on either copyright or passing off grounds.

Tony Lloyd, the Member of Parliament for Manchester Central, addressed Prime Minister Tony Blair during the Prime Minister's Questions, saying, "When large organisations like Sony find their copyright has been breached, they're very quick to use the law. Would the Prime Minister agree with me then that when Sony used images of Manchester Cathedral as part a game which extols gun violence, this was not only in bad taste but also very, very insulting to not simply the Church of England, but people across the land who think it's inappropriate that big corporations behave in this way?"

Blair answered, "I agree with my honourable friend. I think it's important that any of the companies engaged in promoting these types of goods have some sense of responsibility and also some sensitivity to the feelings of others. I think this is an immensely difficult area, the relationship between what happens with these games and its impact on young people. I've no doubt this debate will go on for a significant period of time, but I do agree. I think it is important that people understand there is a wider social responsibility as well as an interior responsibility for profits."

On 15 June 2007, Sony issued the following statement: "We do not accept that there is any connection between contemporary issues of 21st century Manchester and a work of science fiction in which a fictitious 1950s Britain is under attack by aliens. It is not our intention to cause offence by using a representation of Manchester Cathedral in chapter eight of the work. If we have done so we sincerely apologise." The apology was also included in an advertisement in a Manchester newspaper. The Dean of the Manchester Cathedral, the Reverend Rogers Govender, said in a statement: "We acknowledge the admission by Sony that the building in the game is Manchester Cathedral. We thank Sony for the apology they have made. However, we do not move from the position that we are against violence and especially the gun violence seen in this portrayal of the Cathedral." On 6 July 2007, Sony issued an unreserved apology to Manchester Cathedral by publishing it in the Manchester Evening News, although they refused to make a donation.

On the same day, the cathedral announced a proposal for "Sacred Digital Guidelines" to prevent further virtual desecration of religious buildings. These guidelines were debated at the Church of England's General Synod in York. Dean Govender called on Sony as well as all other video game publishers to sign up for these new guidelines. The codes of conduct in the guidelines include that publishers "respect our sacred spaces as places of prayer, worship, peace, learning and heritage"; that they "do not assume that sacred space interiors are copyright free"; that they "get permission from the faith leaders who are responsible for the building interiors you want to clone"; and that they "support the work of those engaged in resisting the culture of gun crime and those involved in promoting the work of conflict resolution."

Georgia Tech professor and Persuasive Games CEO Ian Bogost defended the use of Manchester Cathedral in the game. He described Sony's apology as "self-defeating" and criticised Sony and Insomniac Games for not explaining their goals with the use of the cathedral. He wrote that the cathedral was "one of the only significant experiences in the whole game", where he otherwise described it as "not a game richly imbued with wisdom." He wrote that video games provided players with a way to experience war time situations and called the use of the cathedral "the most powerful of these moments" and the "subtlest" in Resistance. He argued that the use of an accurate depiction of the monument instead of an anonymous location encourages players to pay attention to it as a structure that "demands respect." He wrote that Resistance "adds a fictional homage to the church’s resolve".

Author Harry Joe Brown commented that the protest against Resistance does not represent "just another protest by cultural conservatives against videogame violence"; he described it as a new form of video game criticism. He added that the people involved were not "so uninformed that they mistake science fiction for simulated murder", a notion which he stated was present in gamers' reactions and implied in Sony's apology. He elaborated that the controversy came from the use of assault weaponry in a place of worship, one that plays host to a yearly candlelight vigil for victims of gun violence. He wrote that the "jarring image of an American supersoldier spraying their church with bullets may indeed seem less like a meaningless violation of 'whiny dogma' than a sick joke." He added that, the controversy, while "ridiculous to Sony and the videogame community", demonstrates a growing awareness of religion in a "virtual place", even among the "severest critics of videogames".

Aftermath

During the controversy, Resistance: Fall of Man rose from 40th place in the United Kingdom's top 40 Full Priced video games chart to 22nd place for the week of 17 July to 23 July. It remained in the top 30 through the next week falling to 27th place, and to 36th place in the next week. In November 2009, IGN.com placed the incident in their "Top 10 Gaming Controversies". It was also selected as a finalist along with six other games in the BAFTA British Academy Video Game Awards for the "PC World Gamers Award", which is the only category based on sales and public reception. The Dean of Manchester Cathedral, the Very Reverend Rogers Govender, criticised the selection, stating that "BAFTA should not be seen condoning such behaviour unless they are saying it is acceptable for producers to walk into historic buildings and film interiors – ignoring contracts, rights and liability", asking for either BAFTA or Sony to withdraw the game from the award. Neither withdrew it, but it ultimately lost to Football Manager 2007.

Resistance: Fall of Man has been highly successful despite the controversy, and has resulted in the production of multiple products, including three sequels titled Resistance 2, Resistance 3 and Resistance: Retribution. Resistance developer, Ted Price, commented that there would be more "churches, mosques, and synagogues" in Resistance 2 before its release. While it was not known whether he was joking, he admitted to being Episcopalian, and considers the Church of England to be the "mother ship". However, Sony pledged to not include the cathedral in another game.

Despite the cathedral's reaction to its use in Resistance: Fall of Man, the controversy has resulted in a significant increase in its visitor numbers according to David Marshall, director of communications for the Diocese of Manchester, writing in the Official PlayStation Magazine. Teachers tell him that teenagers in particular are interested to see a building which they thought was fictional. He adds that tourism has increased since the broadcast of pictures taken inside the cathedral.

References

Resistance: Fall of Man
Sony Interactive Entertainment
Resistance: Fall of Man
Resistance: Fall of Man
Resistance (video game series)
Christianity in popular culture controversies